Miroslav Kříženecký (born 1 June 1946) is Czech lawyer, politician, 2003 presidential candidate and former Military prosecutor.

Biography
Born in Malšice, Kříženecký studied at Charles University in Prague where he received his law degree. He became Prosecutor in 1974. He became military prosecutor in 1990. He was involved in the case of Viktor Kožený.

He later became a civil attorney. He was involved in politics in the 1990s and was close to left-wing parties. He became a communist candidate in 2003 presidential election but wasn't elected.

References

1946 births
Living people
20th-century Czech lawyers
Charles University alumni
Candidates in the 2003 Czech presidential election
Communist Party of Bohemia and Moravia presidential candidates
Communist Party of Czechoslovakia politicians
People from Tábor District
Czechoslovak lawyers
21st-century Czech lawyers